The Costa Rica national badminton team represents Costa Rica in international badminton team competitions. The Costa Rican junior team have competed in the BWF World Junior Championships mixed team event, which is also called the Suhandinata Cup.

Participation in BWF competitions 
Suhandinata Cup

Current squad 

Male players
Esteban Hurtado Rojas
Zichong Alejandro Zheng Chen

Female players
Ana Laura Martinez Vega
Lauren Villalobos

References 

Badminton
National badminton teams